Betmead is an English surname. Notable people with the surname include:

 Harry Betmead (1912–1984), English footballer, grandfather of Dominic
 Dominic Betmead, British record producer, songwriter, guitarist, and DJ

English-language surnames